The  (German Mass),  872, is a hymn-cycle by Franz Schubert written in 1827. Neither a Mass nor strictly speaking German, it was published in Vienna as what it is:  (Hymns for the Celebration of the Holy Offering of Mass). It sets a sequence of eight non-liturgical German poems by Johann Philipp Neumann, who commissioned Schubert's music, one or more of which could be used separately during Mass. A ninth hymn, given as an appendix, treats the Lord's Prayer, bringing the length to about 35 minutes when the music is performed, as it often now is, as one big concert work.

The cycle's original scoring was plain: SATB choir with organ accompaniment. Decades after Schubert died, a grander edition was published: SATB choir, 2 oboes, 2 clarinets, 2 bassoons, 2 horns, 2 trumpets, 3 trombones, timpani and basso continuo. Besides the now standard misnomer Deutsche Messe, the cycle is also sometimes called the Wind Mass due to the preponderance of wind instruments in this just-listed orchestration.

Background

The  stems from a tradition of low masses, settings of religious texts in vernacular languages in Austria and southern Germany. It was commissioned by Johann Philipp Neumann, who was interested in simple music designed to appeal to "the widest possible congregation". Neumann wrote the German hymns, which Schubert scored in a block-chordal, homophonic style, suitable for congregational singing. Schubert commenced the work in December 1826, completing and publishing it in 1827. Neumann had previously written the libretto for Schubert's unfinished opera, Shakuntala.

Schubert intended it for usage in Catholic church service. However, censorship prevented this from taking place; it was not approved for liturgical use. The work has since gained popularity, and has been translated into other languages. Richard Proulx arranged a version in English.

Structure

The work contains nine movements, including eight hymns and an appendix. Most of the work is set in a moderate to slow tempo, reflecting the solemnity of the service as well as consideration of church acoustics.

Each of the hymns has a Latin counterpart in the Order of Mass. Performance time is approximately 40 minutes, if performed as a cycle with all the verses.

  (At the Introit), F major, common time: "Wohin soll ich mich wenden"
  (After the consecration), G major, common time: "Betrachtend Deine Huld und Güte"
  (Recessional hymn), F major, 3/4: "Herr, Du hast mein Flehn vernommen"
  (Appendix):  (The Lord's Prayer), E minor ending in parallel major, 6/8: "Anbetend Deine Macht und Größe"

Notes

References

External links

 

1827 compositions
Masses by Franz Schubert